Alexandru Oancea may refer to:

 Alexandru Oancea (bobsleigh) (born 1937), Romanian bobsledder
 Alexandru Oancea (rugby union) (born 1993), Romanian rugby union player